Dicypellium is a genus of two species of flowering plants in the family Lauraceae, native to tropical South America, in Amazon Basin.

Diagnostic characters: they are trees, with the flowers not involucrated, ovary superior, nine or fewer fertile stamens, anthers four-locular and nine tepals, and the fruit with cupules (see illustration).

Dicypellium caryophyllatum, known as "pau-cravo" in Brazil, has bark that smells like cloves.

References
 Rohwer, J. G.: The Genera Dicypellium, Phyllostemonodaphne, Systemonodaphne and Urbanodendron (Lauraceae). Botanische Jahrbücher für Systematik 110(2): 157–171, 1988.

Lauraceae genera
Lauraceae